Olaf Kirchstein (born 4 July 1965) is a German sport shooter who competed in the 2004 Summer Olympics.

References

1965 births
Living people
German male sport shooters
Trap and double trap shooters
Olympic shooters of Germany
Shooters at the 2004 Summer Olympics